Gwardia Wrocław, competing for sponsorship reasons as Chemeko–System Gwardia Wrocław, is a professional men's volleyball club based in Wrocław in southwestern Poland, founded in 1948. Three–time Polish Champion and one time Polish Cup winner. Since 2018, the club has been playing in the 1st Polish Volleyball League.

Honours
 Polish Championship
Winners (3): 1979–80, 1980–81, 1981–82

 Polish Cup
Winners (1): 1980–81

See also

References

External links
 Official website 
 Team profile at TAURON1Liga.pl 
 Team profile at Volleybox.net

Polish volleyball clubs
Sport in Wrocław
Volleyball clubs established in 1948
1948 establishments in Poland